Moone Moonu Varthai is a 2015 Indian Tamil-language comedy film written and directed by Madhumita. The film stars Arjun Chidambaram, Aditi Chengappa and Venkatesh Harinathan. It was simultaneously made in Telugu language under the title Moodu Mukkallo Cheppalante with a slightly different cast where Rakendu Mouli replaces Chidambaram in the Telugu version. The film is produced by S. P. B. Charan and marks the debut of several technicians, including the music director Karthikeya Murthy, the art director Mani Karthik and the editor Kiran Ganti.

Plot 

In a hospital, Arjun narrates his story to Bhagyaraj / 'Idly' Vishwanath who became a flop director and searches for a different story.

Arjun is a talented and carefree youngster who always changes job and wants to lead a carefree life. Having lost his parents, he was raised by his grandparents. His grandfather Subramanyam taunts him for not being responsible but has a soft spot for his grandson. On the other hand, his grandmother is easygoing but is worried about nonchalant attitude.

His best friend Karna, a frustrated IT employee who always butters his boss to save his job, because of Arjun which leads to some comical circumstances finally loses his job. Meanwhile, Arjun's grandparents went to United States to give a visit of their grand daughter who is pregnant. While going his grandfather completely restricts Arjun through financially and he rented his house to his friend and secretly they hopes Arjun to become responsible. So being homeless he came to Karna's home to stay for three months though Karna was angry on him but he allows him to stay and later they makeover.

Arjun and Karna decided to start a business which should be different from others. In a bar they accidentally meet another frustrated drunk IT employee called Muddu Krishna who was very angry on his boss and gives him an offer to conveys his frustration to his boss. Then the drunk duo accepts his offer and they went to his boss residence and scolds him and runs away.

The next morning, realising what they have done Karna is tense but Arjun encourages him to take this act as a business. Which means they convey the bad messages of their clients who cannot convey it to their beloved ones but they need to do, in this situations they earn money. They promote their services through internet and soon earn some more.

Meanwhile, the duo start wooing Anjali and Keerthi, IT professionals who are new to their locality. Soon Anjali falls in love with Arjun but Keerthi rejects Karna's proposal because she has been in love with someone else for two years.

Meanwhile, one of their assignments they went for a marriage they successfully convey the message to Bridegroom's father that 'Bride is loving someone and she was not interested in the marriage and her family was forcing to do' then the chaos ensues the Bride Darshini and her family denies all the allegations are false and they questions who informed them the false statements. Understanding the situation is going out of hands the duo leaves from the place secretly on the notice of Darshini. Later Karna founds that the client Srinivas who is the bridegroom had lied to them to call off his marriage then feeling bad the duo went to Darshini's hometown to apologize her for their act. But there Arjun is stunned to see Anjali as Darshini's younger sister. However he managed from her and returned with Karna. On Karna's insistence they decided to kept it as secret.

Later in a critical circumstance ensues on another assignment they went to convey the new recruits in a company was actually lost their jobs due to recession. The families are hurt after hearing the news and they taunt them severely. Later Arjun's sister calls him to inform that their grandmother had injured her leg. After hearing this Arjun feels sad which thinking their taunts as a bad omen and decided to tell the truth to Anjali. Then he came to tell the truth then Darshini is at her home recognized him and scolds him. Then Arjun tries to apologize to both the sisters but Anjali breaks up with him.

Later in another assignment Arjun is suspicious and he cancels it which angers Karna and they quarrel, which leads to break up their friendship. Arjun's grandparents came back from the states after observing his new behaviour (actually they are expected the same behavior from him) and they question him. A depressed Arjun quarrels with them. However Subramaniam makes the situation cool and suggests him to set it right. Later Arjun ask apologies to his grandparents.

Meanwhile, Karna comes to Keerthi's office and reveals that her lover is a fraudster who used his service to convey his breakup with her. Keerthi feels sad and Karna tells that he came to her out of friendship and not for his business. Later Arjun comes to his home and they both patch up and decide to leave this business and do jobs again. Later however the duo proved the Srinivas is a fraud who is marrying another girl rather than his loved one (which is the prime reason to call off Darshini's marriage) and set it right.

Later Karna learned that Anjali is leaving it may forever the feared Arjun chases her to stop. But the story was interrupted by a nurse for an emergency issue. The director became tensed to know the climax it makes some comical circumstances and in the ICU he was shocked to see Keerthi in the emergency ward absence of Anjali and Karna thinking that Arjun married Keerthi. Then Keerthi baring her labor pains and reveals to Idly that he was successfully married Karna a year ago and Arjun and Anjali are going to marry in a week meanwhile Karna and Anjali comes to safeguard her with doctors. After looking this incident Idly feels happy to have found a new story for directing his next film. Then the film ends with Karna breaking the fourth wall and revealing the climax with his swear word 'in his family'.

Cast

Tamil version
M. S. Bhaskar  as Raaman
Tanikella Bharani as Dayanidhi
 Aarthi
 Robo Shankar
 Badava Gopi

Telugu version
 Ali
 Kadambari Kiran as Muddu Krishna's boss
Tanikella Bharani
M. S. Bhaskar

Soundtrack

Karthikeya Murthy composed the soundtrack for this film, consisting of five songs and three instrumental tracks. On 7 January 2015, two songs from the movie were released as singles at Luxe Cinemas, Phoenix Mall where S. P. Balasubrahmanyam performed Vaazhum Naal, a solo song penned by lyricist Ko Sesha and Porruppu to Parruppu was sung by the music composer himself. The album received positive reviews from critics

Times of India rated the album 3/5 stating "On the whole, an impressive debut by Karthikeya Murthy" (Tamil version). Behindwoods rated the album at 2.50/5 stating the "Moone Moonu Varthai is a fun-filled album from Karthikeya" (Tamil version).

References

External links
 
 

2015 films
2010s Tamil-language films
2010s Telugu-language films
2015 comedy films
Indian comedy films
Indian multilingual films
2015 multilingual films